The State Register of Heritage Places is maintained by the Heritage Council of Western Australia. , 145 places are heritage-listed in the Town of Victoria Park, of which nine are on the State Register of Heritage Places.

List
The Western Australian State Register of Heritage Places, lists the following nine state registered places within the Town of Victoria Park:

References

Victoria Park